Ispat Nagar railway station is a small railway station near Rani Pokhar Village, Bokaro district, Jharkhand on the Adra–Bokaro Steel City branch line. Its code is IPTN. It serves Bokaro Steel City. The station consists of one platform. The platform is not well sheltered. It lacks many facilities including water and sanitation. Currently no passenger train stops in this station.

References

Railway stations in Bokaro district
Adra railway division
Railway stations opened in 1982